Anders Söderberg (born October 7, 1975) is a Swedish former professional ice hockey player. He was selected by the Boston Bruins in the 9th round (234th overall) of the 1996 NHL Entry Draft.

Anders won the Rinkens Riddare (Elitserien Gentleman of the Year award) in 2006-07.

References

External links 

Söderberg retires (Swedish)

1975 births
Living people
Boston Bruins draft picks
Modo Hockey players
People from Örnsköldsvik Municipality
Skellefteå AIK players
Swedish ice hockey left wingers
Sportspeople from Västernorrland County